The Consejo Mundial de Lucha Libre Anniversary Show is the biggest annual professional wrestling event promoted by Mexican professional wrestling promotion Consejo Mundial de Lucha Libre (CMLL), held in September every year, commemorating the creation of CMLL, then known as Empresa Mexicana de Lucha Libre (EMLL), in September 1933 by Salvador Lutteroth. Since Lutteroth built Arena Mexico in Mexico City it's been the home of CMLL and the host of all Anniversary shows held since then. The first show was held in 1934 and since then 81 shows have been held, making it the longest-running annual wrestling event in history and making CMLL the oldest wrestling promotion in existence.

Anniversary show history
A year after EMLL's first show Lutteroth held the "EMLL 1st Anniversary Show" on September 21, 1934, and since then the Anniversary show has been held on a Friday in mid to late September each year as the "biggest show" of EMLL/CMLL's year. The Anniversary show has always been held in Mexico City, EMLL/CMLL's home town, and held in Arena Mexico since 1955 when it was built. When EMLL changed its name to Consejo Mundial de Lucha Libre in 1990 the events became known as the "CMLL Anniversary Shows" but kept the numbering as it was the same organisation, just "rebranded". CMLL promotes the event as the "Anniversary of Wrestling in Mexico" and not just the anniversary of the promotion, but that is more of a promotional statement than the truth. Several promoters had run wrestling shows in Mexico since the early 1920s, but Lutteroth was the first to run a large scale organized promotion and soon became the dominant promotion.

The show often features high-profile Lucha de Apuestas matches where the competitors "bet" their mask or hair; the main event of at least 29 Anniversary shows has been an Apuesta match, including the last nine in a row. The Anniversary shows have seen the high-profile mask losses of such wrestlers as Mano Negra, Cien Caras, Universo 2000, Black Warrior, Blue Panther, Volador Jr. and Último Guerrero. A large number of wrestlers have lost their hair at the Anniversary show, with the most recent being Negro Casas who was shaved bald after losing an Apuesta match against Místico on the 76th Anniversary Show. The Anniversary shows often see "special guest appearances" of well known wrestlers from the United States, Canada or Japan.

Dates, venues, and main events
''NOTE:  There are some years with multiple Anniversary Shows.  There was no 52nd Anniversary because of an earthquake a day before the  bell time.

References

General sources

Specific sources

Recurring events established in 1934
 
Professional wrestling anniversary shows